The Free Palestine Movement is a Palestinian Syrian armed movement and community organization that is led by the businessman Yasser Qashlaq and supports the Ba'athist government of Syria. The organization opposes the existence of Israel, and was mostly known for political activism and social services in favor of Palestinians in Syria and the Gaza Strip before 2012. Upon the outbreak of the Syrian Civil War, however, the Free Palestine Movement formed its own militias and has since then openly fought for the Syrian government against various rebel groups.

History

Early activities 
The Free Palestine Movement was founded by Yasser Qashlaq, a Syria-born Palestinian businessman of considerable wealth who heads several organizations including the Lebanese Institute of International Studies, the Syrian-Palestinian Investment House, the Palestinian Businessmen's Club, and also owns a small Lebanese newspaper. Furthermore, Yasser is known for his antisemitic views, having repeatedly called Jews "dregs of European garbage", a "gang of criminal murderers", and "human pieces of filth" that should be deported to Europe. He has also stated that there is "no reason for coexistence" between Israelis and Palestinians, as the latter would reclaim their lands and "hunt [the Israelis] down to the end of the world, and prosecute them for their massacres". Though close to the Syrian government, Yasser has denied any links with Hezbollah.

When Yasser first became politically active in the Palestinian Yarmouk Camp of Damascus in 2003, he consequently presented himself as supporting the Second Intifada. Since then, he organized the Free Palestine Movement as community organization which provided social services for Palestinians in Syria and rallied support for the Baa'athist government. Atlantic Council expert Tom Rollins also argued that the organization serves as "vehicle for [Yasser Qashlaq's] political ambitions". According to Qashlaq, the Free Palestine Movement took part in organizing the Freedom Flotilla II for the Gaza Strip in 2010/11.

Syrian Civil War 

After the Syrian Civil War's start, the Free Palestine Movement began to recruit for pro-government militias and founded its own paramilitary wing, the "Al-Aqsa Shield Forces" in 2012. The Al-Aqsa Shield Forces mostly operate in Damascus, especially after an informal power-sharing agreement between the Free Palestine Movement and Fatah al-Intifada, another pro-government militia, in 2016. According to this agreement Yasser Qashlaq paid Fatah al-Intifada a substantial sum for handing over parts of their frontline at the Yarmouk Camp to the Free Palestine Movement. In consequence, Yasser and his movement could gain "valuable political capital" as defenders of Yarmouk which is of great symbolic importance to the Palestinian diaspora, while Fatah al-Intifada got much-needed funds. Since then, the Free Palestine Movement mostly fought the Islamic State of Iraq and the Levant militants in Yarmouk Camp, notably participating in the Southern Damascus offensives of March and April and May 2018. In the latter operation the organization's military commander, Saed Abd Al-Aal, was wounded in combat. Fighters of the Free Palestine Movement have also fought in other areas of Damascus, including at Harasta in August 2017 and at al-Shaghour during the Rif Dimashq offensive of early 2018.

Though the Free Palestine Movement's activity is mostly concentrated in Damascus, the organization is known to have committed forces to fronts in other regions of Syria as well. In a notable incident in May 2013, the "Abd al-Qadir al-Husayni Battalions", another armed group affiliated with the movement, fired two mortar shells at Israel Defense Forces positions on Mount Hermon. This was reportedly done in commemoration of Nakba Day. Troops of the Free Palestine Movement also operated in Hama in late 2017, and fought in the Battle of Deir ez-Zor (September–November 2017).

After the Yarmouk Camp was fully secured by government forces in May 2018, some locals started to burn down their own houses to prevent them from being looted. In response, the Free Palestine Movement declared that these people would have to account for their actions, and that it would try to prevent further burnings. The group, along with as-Sa'iqa and Fatah al-Intifada, also started to lay off many of its fighters due to the decreasing need for them and lack of funds. Commander Saed Abd Al-Aal denied this, however, and claimed that the Free Palestine Movement had simply redeployed its fighters from Damascus to other war zones. When an Irish parliamentary delegation visited Yarmouk Camp in late July 2018 to evaluate the damage caused by the years-long combat, it was accompanied by Saed Abd Al-Aal. The Free Palestine Movement took part in a festival in honor of Yasser Arafat on 11 November 2018.

At some point in early 2019, the Free Palestine Movement sent detachments to take part in counter-insurgency operations in Deir ez-Zor Governorate, and contributed troops to the Northwestern Syria offensive (April–August 2019). In course of the latter campaign, its troops fought at Halfaya and al-Zakah. In October 2019, a FPM member was shot dead by unknown assailants in Da'el. Meanwhile, the FPM continued to demobilize fighters due to a lack of funds. From late 2019, the party's troops took part in the government's Northwestern Syria offensive (December 2019–March 2020). Around the same time, the Free Palestine Movement was also active in Latakia Governorate, where one of its fighters was killed at Salma.

After the Northwestern Syria offensive's conclusion, the Free Palestine Movement continued to be active in Idlib, where it held border posts at the frontline. In February 2020, seven members of the group were killed during clashes in the region.

Organization 
The Free Palestine Movement is officially led by Yasser Qashlaq, while Saed Abd Al-Aal serves as the commander of the organization's paramilitary wing. The armed forces of the Free Palestine Movement have been described as "rag-tag militia" and include the Saraya Bader, the Al-Aqsa Shield Forces as well as the Abd al-Qadir al-Husayni Battalions. Like other pro-government militias in Syria, the Free Palestine Movement reportedly attracts new recruits with relatively high monthly salaries, as many young Syrian Palestinians are in precarious economic conditions due to the civil war and mass unemployment. By November 2018, 24 fighters had died while fighting in the Syrian Civil War for the FPM.

Alleged criminal activities and war crimes 
According to the pro-opposition site Zaman AlWasl and other investigators, two (ex-)members of the Free Palestine Movement, namely Mofeq AlDaouah and Mahmoud Arnaout, were involved in war crimes during the Syrian Civil War. They allegedly targeted and killed civilians during the Siege of Yarmouk Camp. In addition, Zaman AlWasl accused Mofeq of several cases of rape in Yarmouk Camp. According to local activists, the Free Palestine Movement is also involved in criminal business schemes which pressured residents of Yarmouk Camp to sell property under value to make way for a major reconstruction plan of the cityscape.

Mofeq was arrested by the German police in Berlin on 4 August 2021. He is accused of having fired an anti-tank weapon into a crowd of civilians, who were waiting for UN food handouts on 23 March 2014 in Yarmouk Camp. At least seven people were killed in the attack.

References 

Anti-ISIL factions in Syria
Pro-government factions of the Syrian civil war
2003 establishments in Syria
Palestinian militant groups
Antisemitism in Syria
Axis of Resistance